Minnamurra is a 1989 Australian film about a feisty woman who lives on a country property. It is also known as Outback and Wrangler.

The plot appears to have been inspired by The Squatter's Daughter. David Stratton called it "almost The Man from Snowy River III in terms of plot and character".

Cast
 Jeff Fahey as Ben Creed
 Tushka Bergen as Alice May Richards
 Steven Vidler as Jack Donaghue
 Richard Moir as Bill Thompson
 Shane Briant as Allenby
 Fred Parslow as James Richards
 Cornelia Frances as Caroline Richards
 Michael Winchester as Rupert Richards
 Sandy Gore as Maude Richards
 Drew Forsythe as Henry Iverson
 Owen Weingott as General Smith
 Mic Conway as Fredie
 Wallas Eaton as Grassmore
 Peter Collingwood as Banker
 Gerry Skilton as Cookie

References

External links

Minnamurra at Oz Movies

1989 films
Australian Western (genre) films
1980s English-language films
1980s Australian films